Frederick Charles Brayton (October 20, 1925 – March 28, 2015), usually known as Chuck Brayton or Bobo Brayton, was an American college baseball head coach; he led the Washington State Cougars for 33 seasons, from 1962 to 1994. He is the winningest coach in school history, with a record of 1,162 wins, 523 losses and eight ties—the fourth-best total in NCAA history at the time he retired.

His Cougar teams won 21 conference titles (two Northern Division and 19 Pac-8/10), including 11 in a row from 1970 to 1980. He led the Cougars to the College World Series in 1965 and 1976, and was the fifth baseball head coach in NCAA history to exceed a thousand wins. Win number 1,000 came in 1990 in his 29th season, at home on April 11, and he coached four more years.

Brayton was a three-sport varsity athlete at Washington State and played shortstop in 1944 for interim coach Jack Friel and from 1946 to 1948 for Buck Bailey; he was named the school's first baseball All-American in 1947. As an incoming freshman in September 1943, Brayton hitchhiked across the state to Pullman from Skagit County in northwestern Washington. After his freshman year, he served 18 months in the Army Air Forces. His #14 jersey was retired by the school in 2003, and he was inducted into the National College Baseball Hall of Fame in 2007.

Bailey–Brayton Field, the Cougars' home stadium since 1980, is named for Brayton and his predecessor, 
Buck Bailey (1896–1964). When the old field was displaced by the new Mooberry track, Brayton constructed the new stadium on a budget, using items salvaged from Sick's Stadium in Seattle, as well as donated materials and volunteer labor. Formerly "Buck Bailey Field," Brayton's name joined his mentor's in January 2000.

Prior to coaching at WSU, Brayton was the head coach for over a decade at Yakima Valley Junior College, and also its head football coach for five seasons. He had a record of 251–68 in 11 seasons at Yakima and won ten championships. While at Yakima, a line drive nearly killed him and he was hospitalized for a month; he wore a helmet the rest of his coaching career.

In declining health in his later years, Brayton died at age 89 at his Pullman home in 2015, and was buried at the city cemetery.

Head coaching record

See also

List of college baseball coaches with 1,100 wins

References

External links
College Baseball Hall of Fame website
Video of induction speech
Yakima Valley Community College Athletics Hall of Fame
Baseball Essentials – Remembering Chuck "Bobo" Brayton (1925–2015)
Obituary

1925 births
2015 deaths
All-American college baseball players
National College Baseball Hall of Fame inductees
Sportspeople from Vancouver, Washington
Washington State Cougars baseball coaches
Washington State Cougars baseball players
Washington State Cougars football players
Washington State Cougars men's basketball players
American men's basketball players
United States Army Air Forces personnel of World War II